The Mirage 26 is a Canadian sailboat, that was designed by American Robert Perry and first built in 1976. The design is out of production.

Production
The boat was built by Mirage Yachts in Canada from 1976 to 1981.

The Mirage 26 design was replaced in production in 1982 by the Perry-designed Mirage 27, which has a reverse transom and inboard-mounted rudder.

Design
The Mirage 26 is a small recreational keelboat, built predominantly of fibreglass. It has a masthead sloop rig, a transom-hung rudder and a fixed fin keel. It displaces  and carries  of lead ballast.

The boat has a PHRF racing average handicap of 210 with a high of 198 and low of 225.

Operational history
In a review Michael McGoldrick wrote, "these are good looking boats with a sensible and comfortable interior. The Mirage 26 was the first of these two models to be built. It had a quasi transom mounted rudder (there is small cutout in the transom to accommodate the rudder). The Mirage 26 was replaced by the 27 foot model, which has a reverse transom and an inboard rudder. Except for the addition of the reverse transom on the Mirage 27, the line drawings for these two boats are almost identical in every other respect. The 26 foot model tends to be powered by the gasoline OMC saildrive, while some of the 27s come with a small diesel. Because of its longer waterline, the Mirage 27 is the faster of the two boats."

See also

List of sailing boat types

Similar sailboats
Beneteau First 26
Beneteau First 265
C&C 26
C&C 26 Wave
Contessa 26
Dawson 26
Discovery 7.9
Grampian 26
Herreshoff H-26
Hunter 26
Hunter 26.5
Hunter 260
Hunter 270
MacGregor 26
Nash 26
Nonsuch 26
Outlaw 26
Paceship PY 26
Parker Dawson 26
Pearson 26
Sandstream 26
Tanzer 26
Yamaha 26

References

External links

Keelboats
1970s sailboat type designs
Sailing yachts 
Sailboat type designs by Robert Perry
Sailboat types built by Mirage Yachts